Established in 1997, Pantai Hospital Penang (formerly known as Hospital Pantai Mutiara) is a 190 bedded specialist hospital in the satellite town of Bayan Baru, Penang, Malaysia.

Pantai Hospital Penang offers services in Radiotherapy & Oncology, Cardiology, Dentistry, Neurology, Neurosurgery and Cardiothoracic Surgery. It also houses the only Stroke Center in the Northern Region.

The hospital has 49 full-time specialist doctors, 15 sessional and 6 visiting specialist doctors. New facilities and services such as the recent additions - Urology, Extracorporeal Shock Wave Lithotripsy, Stroke Centre, Interventional Radiology, Radiotherapy and Brachytherapy (Intensity Modulated Radiation Therapy) – are part of the hospital.

Medical Centres
 Birth Education Classes
 Cardiology
 Dental Clinic
 Health Screening
 Inpatient Care
 Physical & Rehabilitation Medicine

Collectively, the Pantai group of hospitals treat over 158,000 patients annually from a pool of more than 890 doctors and 2,800 nurses. They provide a range of medical services ranging from health and wellness check ups to cardiac surgery.

References

1997 establishments in Malaysia
Hospital buildings completed in 1997
Hospitals in Penang
Hospitals established in 1997
20th-century architecture in Malaysia